Radcliffe is a town in the Metropolitan Borough of Bury, Greater Manchester, England, and includes the village of Ainsworth and the countryside around and between them.  It is unparished, and contains 31 listed buildings that are recorded in the National Heritage List for England.  Of these, two are listed at Grade I, the highest of the three grades, three are at Grade II*, the middle grade, and the others are at Grade II, the lowest grade.  The listed buildings include farmhouses and farm buildings, private houses, churches and associated items, a ruined pele tower, a public house, two structures associated with the demolished Mount Sion Mill, a disused railway viaduct, and a war memorial.


Key

Buildings

References

Citations

Sources

Lists of listed buildings in Greater Manchester
Buildings and structures in the Metropolitan Borough of Bury
Listed